Vecchio is an Italian language surname, meaning literally "old man". Notable people with the surname include:

Carlos Vecchio (born 1969), Venezuelan lawyer, politician and social activist
Emiliano Vecchio (born 1988), Argentine footballer
Karen Vecchio (born 1971), Canadian politician
Mary Ann Vecchio (born 1955), American photographee
Palma Vecchio (c. 1480–1528), Venetian painter

See also
Del Vecchio (surname)